Tales from the Palaces is a British television documentary series following the conservation teams inside Britain's Historic Royal Palaces: Hampton Court, the Tower of London, Kensington Palace, the Banqueting House and Kew Palace.

It was produced by BBC and has been shown worldwide including in Australia on the SBS network. The ten-part series was filmed over a year and was first shown on BBC Four in September 2005 and repeated on BBC Two in 2006.

DVD 
This series is available on DVD, distributed by Acorn Media UK.

External links
 
 

BBC television documentaries
2005 British television series debuts
2005 British television series endings